Granary Island is an island in the district (dzielnica) Śródmieście of the city of Gdańsk, Poland. It is located east of the Main City. The island is enclosed by the Motława from the west and New Motława from the east. It is one of the two islands located on the Motława, alongside Ołowianka in the north.

History 
The Motława river is the oldest part of the trade port. On the eastern bank granaries had been erected since the 14th century. The number was growing up to 300. The island was created when the New Motława was dug out in 1576. In Second World War  Most of the granaries on the northern part were demolished during siege of Danzig in March 1945.

Bridges and tourist attractions
The Voivodeship road DW 501 is leading over the southern part of the island and both parts of the river Motława.

Bridges over the Motława:
 Two bridges to Toruńska street
 Most Krowi (Cow Bridge) to Cow Gate
 Zielony Most (Green Bridge) to Green Gate and Long Market
 A swing bridge (Kładka św. Ducha) for pedestrians was mounted in 2019 and opened in 2020.
Bridge over the New Motława:
 Most Stągiewny from Milk can Gate
Historical buildings:
 Brama Stągiewna (Milk can Gate), erected between 1517 and 1519
 granary Błękitny Baranek (Blue Lamb), erected in the 16th and 18th centuries, with elements from 1360; part of the Archeological Museum
 granary Deo Gloria, integrated in the modern front of buildings

References

See also 

 Islands of Gdańsk
 Mill Island, Bydgoszcz
 Grudziądz Granaries

Islands of Poland
Gdańsk